"Sick Boy" is a song by American electronic music duo the Chainsmokers. It was written by the Chainsmokers, Tony Ann and Emily Warren, with production handled by the Chainsmokers and Shaun Frank. The song was released by Disruptor Records and Columbia Records on January 17, 2018, as the lead single from the duo's second studio album of the same name.

Release
On the first day of 2018, the Chainsmokers teased new material by revealing their new logo on social media. They captioned the post: "How many likes is my life worth?" On January 16, 2018, the song was promoted on a Spotify-branded billboard in Times Square, which reads: "How many likes is my life worth?" "Sick Boy" was described as "a song about self-identity in today's world and standing tall in the face of what you can and can't control" in press materials.

Music video
The accompanying music video, directed by Brewer, features both members of the Chainsmokers and Matt McGuire performing the song on an empty soundstage. Throughout the video, their internals are exposed by stage lights.

Critical reception
"Sick Boy" received mixed reviews from critics. Kat Bein of Billboard opined that the song "sounds like a big departure from the New York City duo's usual romantic pop flair". Dave Holmes of Esquire called it the duo's version of Michael Jackson's "Man in the Mirror" with a twist. He continued: "It is the sound of two men coming to terms with having worked at a Hollister for a summer in college. It is the worst of EDM, with all of the fun surgically removed. It is, for me, a baw-eest." Mike Watkins of The Michigan Daily praised the song, calling it "another diatribe against society" with "scathingly sarcastic criticism" expressed throughout the song. He wrote that "the song's chorus is big and somewhat catchy" and expect it to be a radio hit. Matthew Schnipper of Pitchfork described the song as "a turn toward the meaningful" for the duo. "In practice, though, the song comes off more like a parody than a parable," he wrote.

Madeline Roth of MTV News regarded the song as "a catchy but gloomy slice of pure pop that sounds more like Twenty One Pilots than anything on their 2017 debut album, Memories...Do Not Open". She felt the duo has "abandoned the romantic, wistful flair" of previous songs and instead took "a decidedly darker" approach, writing that the song is "basically the opposite of '#Selfie'". Hugh McIntyre of Fuse noted that the song is "pure pop", unlike songs from their beginnings which made them popular. He furthered: "The Chainsmokers are now unabashedly trafficking in the laptop-made pop that most stars churn out, which they've been heading towards for some time." Comparing to party tracks like "Don't Let Me Down", he noticed the song of being "darker in tone", describing it as "downright gloomy", which strays away from their "wistful and melancholy" style. Similarly, Tom Skinner of NME found the song unexpectedly dark. Derrick Rossignol of Uproxx wrote: "Musically, it strays further away from their EDM roots and more towards the successful pop sound they've developed for themselves, albeit with a more aggressive edge this time around."

Track listing

Credits and personnel
Credits adapted from Tidal.
 Andrew Taggart - production, record engineering, composition, voice.
 Alex Pall – production, record engineering, composition.
 Tony Ann – piano, composition.
 Shaun Frank – production, mix engineering, programming
 Chris Gehringer – master engineering

Charts

Weekly charts

Year-end charts

Certifications

Release history

References

2018 singles
2018 songs
The Chainsmokers songs
Songs written by Andrew Taggart
Songs written by Emily Warren
Columbia Records singles
Songs written by Alex Pall